Gary Edward Luck (born August 5, 1937) is a retired four-star general of the United States Army. Following his retirement, he was a senior advisor to the United States Joint Forces Command prior to that command's inactivation. He is currently a Senior Fellow for the National Defense University in support of the Pinnacle, Capstone, and Keystone programs.

Education
Receiving a bachelor's degree in engineering from Kansas State University in 1959, Luck also holds a master's degree from Florida State University and a doctorate in business administration (Operations Research and Systems Analysis, a/k/a ORSA) from George Washington University. In addition, Luck has attended numerous military schools and courses, to include the Armor Basic and Advanced Officer courses, Army Aviator training, the Armed Forces Staff College, and the United States Army War College.

Military career
Luck is a combat veteran of both the Vietnam War and the Gulf War and has held a variety of command and staff positions throughout his army career, to include: Chief of Staff, 8th Infantry Division, U.S. Army, Europe; Director, Force Programs, Office of the Deputy Chief of Staff for Operations and Plans, HQ Department of the Army; Assistant Division Commander, 101st Airborne Division; Commanding General, 2nd Infantry Division, Korea; Commanding General, Joint Special Operations Command (1989–1990); Commanding General, U.S. Army Special Operations Command; and Commanding General, XVIII Airborne Corps during Operation Desert Shield and Operation Desert Storm (1990–1993).

His last military assignment before retiring from active duty was as Commander-in-Chief, United Nations Command (Korea)/Combined Forces Command/United States Forces Korea. During this time the United States and North Korea nearly went to war over North Korea's development of weapons-grade plutonium at the Yongbyon nuclear facility and threat to withdraw from the Nuclear Non-Proliferation Treaty. Luck warned President Bill Clinton that a renewal of the Korean conflict would cost "A million, a hundred billion, and a trillion," meaning 1 million American casualties, $100 billion in economic costs to the United States, and $1 trillion in industrial damage to South Korea. The crisis was ultimately defused by the successful negotiation of the USA-DPRK Agreed Framework, but North Korea eventually acquired nuclear weapons.

General Luck, then a major general, served as officer in charge of Operation Pocket Planner in November 1987, where members of the United States Army Special Operations Command responded to the Atlanta prison riots.

Post-military life
Since his retirement from the Army, Luck has served in a variety of senior advisory positions in support of the United States Department of Defense, overseeing exercise control during Exercise Millennium Challenge 2002, and as an advisor to then-Commander of United States Central Command, General Tommy Franks, prior to the US led invasion of Iraq in 2003. He was sent back to Iraq in early 2005 in order to investigate various areas of operation, identifying any weaknesses and reporting back to commanders at The Pentagon with a confidential assessment on what could be done to install democracy in Iraq and to set a date for the withdrawal of American and coalition forces. That same year, Luck was also the 2005 recipient of the Doughboy Award from the National Infantry Association.

Awards and decorations

References

1937 births
Living people
Kansas State University alumni
United States Army aviators
Florida State University alumni
George Washington University School of Business alumni
United States Army generals
Recipients of the Air Medal
Recipients of the Distinguished Service Medal (US Army)
Recipients of the Distinguished Flying Cross (United States)
Recipients of the Legion of Merit
Recipients of the Defense Distinguished Service Medal
Recipients of the Meritorious Service Medal (United States)
Recipients of the Humanitarian Service Medal
Commanders, United States Forces Korea